The Royan Festival (or more fully in French the Festival international d'art contemporain de Royan) was held in Royan, in the department of Charente-Maritime in the Nouvelle-Aquitaine region of southwest France from 1964 to 1977. It was a multi-disciplinary annual event, bringing together:

 an important contemporary music festival;
 dance performances;
 theater;
 movies;
 international exhibitions of photographic research;
 exhibitions of visual arts and arts of the East, the Far East and Africa.

Created in 1963 by Dr. Bernard Gachet, the festival was primarily focused on contemporary music. Its artistic director was Claude Samuel from 1964 to 1972 then Harry Halbreich from 1973 to 1977. The festival was held annually for one week around Easter. Soon, its musical production, the Festival de Royan became as famous as those of Donaueschingen and Venice.

The Olivier Messiaen international piano competition was part of the festival until 1971. In 1972, it was replaced by a flute competition.

Publishing and principal creations

1966

 Triad of Gilbert Amy
 Interference of Paul Méfano
 De Natura Sonoris of Krzysztof Penderecki
 Terretektorh of Iannis Xenakis
 Variations for Orchestra of Igor Stravinsky

1967

 Archipelago I by André Boucourechliev
 On the opera travel by Betsy Jolas
 Dans le deuil des vagues I by Gérard Masson

1968

 Trajectoires by Gilbert Amy
 Le Temps restitué by Jean Barraqué
 Lines by Paul Méfano
 Imaginario II by Luis de Pablo
 Punkte by Karlheinz Stockhausen
 Solo by Franco Donatoni
 Nuits by Iannis Xenakis

1969

 Sinfonia by Berio
 Archipelago II by Boucourechliev
 Polychrome Reliefs by Jean-Pierre Guézec
 Quadrivium by Bruno Maderna
 Nomos Gamma by Xenakis

1970

 Cette étoile enseigne à s'incliner by Gilbert Amy
 Archipelago IV by André Boucourechliev
 Fourteen Stations by Marius Constant
 Ceremony II by Pierre Henry
 Holidays Symphony by Charles Ives
 The Ceremony by Paul Méfano

1971

The theme this year was the contemporary music of Eastern Europe.

 Schichten, by Carlos Roqué Alsina
 Austrahlungen, by Vinko Globokar
 Screen, by Anatol Vieru
 Synaphaï, by Iannis Xenakis.

It was also the year that created the international exhibition of photographic research (SIRP).

1972

The edition was devoted mainly to the "younger generation".

 Ludwig Van by Mauricio Kagel
 Madrigal by Paul Méfano
 Lovercraft by Tristan Murail

1973

 Solo by Franco Donatoni
 Isoritmi by Giuseppe Sinopoli (April 16)
 Preludes and Fugue for Witold Lutoslawski
 Kermit by François-Bernard Mâche
 Blue far from Gérard Masson
 Extensions of Francis Miroglio
 24 Preludes of Maurice Ohana
 Cello Concerto by Penderecki
 Choralvorspiele by Dieter Schnebel
 Photoptosis and Ecclesiastical Action by Bernd Alois Zimmermann

1974

That year, no fewer than 49 composers (including 15 born after 1940) are found in Royan, 18 different nationalities. Cent creations will be produced during a week.

 Clocks and Clouds by György Ligeti
 Symphony of René Koering
 The Drift of the Continents by Tristan Murail
 Missa brevis and Sieben Sterne of Brian Ferneyhough 
 Shanti by Jean-Claude Eloy
 Melodies of Paul Méfano
 Tenebrae by Klaus Huber
 Bergkristall by Sylvano Bussotti
 Aura by Bruno Maderna
 On Mi by Boesmans
 Quartet of René Koering
 Quartet of Gérard Masson

1975

 Sonatas for String Quartet and Transit by Brian Ferneyhough ;
 Quartet by Heinz Holliger ;
 Sands by Tristan Murail ;
 Memories to the memory of Giuseppe Sinopoli ;
 Lamento di Gesu by Radulescu ;
 Espressivo by Franco Donatoni ;
 Pinturas Negras and Tiempo para espacios by Cristobal Halffter ;
 Puzzle by Philippe Manoury ;
 Threnody by Boucourechliev ;
 Down to a Sunless Sea by Hugues Dufour ;
 Musik im Bauch by Karlheinz Stockhausen .

1976

 Requiem Hashshirim by Giuseppe Sinopoli (mars 25) NDR Chorale
 Waves of Paul Méfano ;
 Ecce Opus by Francisco Guerrero ;
 Cello Concerto by Cristobal Halffter ;
 Cello Concerto in Isang Yun ;
 III intervals of Boesmans ;
 Sinfonie of Friedrich Cerha .

1977

 The Storm and Erewhon by Hugues Dufourt 
 Symphony by Jacques Lenot 
 Lichtzwang by Wolfgang Rihm 
 Symphony No. 3 by Henryk Górecki 
 Ruf by Emmanuel Nunes

Bibliography

 Festival international d'art contemporain de Royan 1964-1977 - Henri Besancon, Ed. Bonne Anse, 158 pages, 2007

Music festivals in France